Nymphalis cyanomelas, the Mexican tortoiseshell, is a butterfly species in the family Nymphalidae. It resides from southern Mexico to El Salvador.

Description
The undersides of both the male's and female's wings are dark mottled brown, much like tree bark, for camouflage when the wings are together. The top side is mostly bark brown changing to blue (cyan, hence the generic name cyanomelas) or greenish blue towards the wingtips. The wingtips also have chevrons or lozenge-shaped dark markings along the wing margins. Males and females are similarly marked.

References
Mexican Tortoiseshell, Butterflies of America
Nymphalis cyanomelas (Mexican Tortoiseshell), Interactive Listing of Mexican Butterflies

Nymphalis
Butterflies described in 1848